is a private university at Itano, Tokushima, Japan, founded in 1973.

External links 
 Official website

Educational institutions established in 1973
Japanese junior colleges
Universities and colleges in Tokushima Prefecture
1973 establishments in Japan
Itano, Tokushima